Anastasia Huppmann (born 16 November 1988) is a Russian-born Austrian concert pianist. Her repertoire includes compositions from solo works of Frédéric Chopin, Franz Liszt, Joseph Haydn, Claude Debussy, Ludwig van Beethoven, the orchestral works of Sergei Prokofiev and Rodion Shchedrin.

Life 
Born in Russia, Anastasia Huppmann  discovered her love for music very early. At the age of five, she started playing the piano. Soon after, the music school board recognised her musical talent and Anastasia began receiving individual lessons for gifted children in piano, composition and music theory. At the age of seven she appeared playing her own music-compositions live on TV and won her first piano competition. When she was eight, she placed third in the Musical College of Norilsk piano competition. She attended the gifted-children program at the University of Smolensk, and later the University of Arts at Saratov. She completed her piano studies at the State Conservatory in Rostov-on-Don (Russia) and at the Vienna Conservatory, both with distinction.

Huppmann continued her education at the Academy of Music in Hannover (Germany). She participated in the solo classes of Prof. Karl-Heinz Kaemmerling until his sudden death.

Huppmann has won more than 20 piano competitions, including the "XXI Century competition" in Kiev (Ukraine), the "Professor Dichler competition" in Vienna (Austria), the "Bluethner special prize" in Vienna (Austria), the "Osaka international Piano Competition"  in Osaka (Japan), the International Concorso Pianistico "Vietri sul Mare – Costa Amalfitana" and the Premio di esecuzione Pianistica International "Antonio Napolitano" Citta di Salerno (Italy), the International Piano Competition "Grand Prix International, Jeunes Talents" in Lyon (France).

Awards 
Huppmann has received a number of awards in piano competitions, including
 2005: First Prize – XXI Century competition (Kyiv, Ukraine)
 2009: First Prize – Professor Dichler competition (Vienna, Austria)
 2009: Bluethner Special Prize in the framework of the Erika Chary competition (Austria)
 2009: Third Prize – Osaka International Piano Competition [no first prize awarded] (Japan)
 2011: First Prize – XI International Concorso Pianistico Vietri sul Mare – Costa Amalfitana (Italy)
 2011: First Prize – Premio di Esecuzione Pianistica IXth International Antonio Napolitano, Citta di Salerno (Italy)
 2012: First Place  – International Piano Competition 14th Grand Prix International, Jeunes Talents (France)
Numerous solo performances in Ukraine, Russia, Austria, France, Poland, Spain, Italy, and active collaboration with various national orchestras have led Huppmann to the great concert halls of Europe and Asia.

Discography 
 2014: Travel through three centuries
 2016: Chopin / Liszt (Gramola)

She has also published a collection of videos of selected works on her dedicated YouTube channel. Her channel has a large following, with more than a million views on some of the videos.

References

External links 
 

1988 births
Living people
People from Tver
Russian classical pianists
Russian women pianists
Austrian classical pianists
Austrian women pianists
Russian emigrants to Austria
21st-century classical pianists
Women classical pianists
21st-century women pianists